Gustav Collin (23 May 1890 – 25 October 1966) was a Swedish swimmer. He competed in the men's 1500 metre freestyle event at the 1912 Summer Olympics.

References

External links
 

1890 births
1966 deaths
Olympic swimmers of Sweden
Swimmers at the 1912 Summer Olympics
Swimmers from Stockholm
Swedish male freestyle swimmers